Andrew Vinius (Andrey Andreyevich Vinius) (1641–1717) of a Dutch family became a Russian statesman and a friend of Peter the Great. He taught the young Peter European languages. He was a member of Peter's close-knit group of friends who organized themselves into the Jolly Company and The All-Joking, All-Drunken Synod of Fools and Jesters.

Life
Vinius was the  son of a Dutch merchant Andries Winius, who in 1627 associated with Isaac Massa and went to Moscovia as a grain trader. In 1628 he married Geertruid van Rijn. In 1632, during the time of Michael of Russia, he settled in Russia to found a water-powered ironworks in Tula, Russia, and in Serpukhov. Then he seems to have forced his wife to become either Greek Orthodox, or Russian Orthodox. Their son Andrew was raised to speak, besides Dutch, also Russian and German; he knew French, Polish and Latin too, which he later taught to Peter the Great. Around 1664 Vinius married an aristocratic Russian woman. He became the translator of his second cousin Nicolaas Witsen in 1665, visiting the country in the company of Jacob Boreel. Witsen became his life long friend with their common interest in cartography.

Vinius, who lived in the German Suburb with most of the other foreigners of Moscow, served in the Ministry of Foreign Affairs. Between 1672 and 1674 he travelled as a diplomat to London, Paris and Madrid. He then headed, together with his brother, to the Post Office, becoming the first Russian Postmaster in 1675. So he was able to secretly send maps and all kinds of antique objects to Witsen.

Vinius taught the young Tsarevich Peter Dutch (and Latin?). He often corresponded with Peter, on matters ranging from war games and military strategy to their drunken parties as part of the Drunken Synod. Vinius was also the one who, after the Azov campaigns, arranged the parade into Moscow under a pagan arch that bewildered many Muscovites.

During the Great Northern War, after the Battle of Narva, Russian artillery was reduced to almost nothing. Peter appointed Vinius to the post of Inspector of Artillery and ordered him to produce more cannons. Upon the Tsar's order and against the wishes of many Russians, Vinius melted down many of the church bells of Russia and even ordered beating-by-knout of the iron founders who were working too slowly. By melting a quarter of the church bells in Russia, eight months after the end of the Battle of Narva Vinius managed to produce hundreds of cannons to send to the Russian army. Despite his old age, on Peter's command, he also went into Siberia to look for potential new mines, and ended up establishing several ironworks beyond the Ural Mountains.
In 1700 and in 1706 he came to the Dutch Republic. Vinius had lost all of his land and goods, because of a conflict with Alexander Danilovich Menshikov. Vinius tried to connect the Greek- or Russian Orthodox and Dutch Reformed church. In 1709 Vinius was back in Moscow and received back his property. In 1712 his house burned down; his wife died in the fire.

References

Bibliography
 
 
 
 
 Marion Peters, De wijze koopman. Het wereldwijde onderzoek van Nicolaes Witsen (1641-1717), burgemeester en VOC-bewindhebber van Amsterdam (Amsterdam 2010) [Transl.: "Mercator Sapiens. The Worldwide Investigations of Nicolaes Witsen, Amsterdam Mayor and Boardmember of the East India Company"]

External links
 Portrait of his parents by Isaac Luttichuys

Peter the Great
1641 births
1717 deaths
Russian postmasters
Russian people of Dutch descent